The Japan Bowl (in Japanese, ジャパンボウル) was a post-season college football all-star game played in Japan each January from 1976 to 1993, which showcased East and West all-star teams made up of college football players from the United States.

History
The first game was played in 1976 in Tokyo, to a crowd of 68,000 spectators. After being played at National Stadium for four years, the game moved to Yokohama in 1980, where it was played at Yokohama Stadium through 1991. The final two game were held at Tokyo Dome in 1992 and 1993.

From 1983 through 1989, the game was sponsored by Ricoh and was known as the Ricoh Japan Bowl.

The bowl featured various famous participants, including Heisman Trophy winners Bo Jackson and Ty Detmer, who both received MVP awards. College Football Hall of Fame coach Lou Holtz led the East team in the 1976 game, and Super Bowl XLIV champion Mark Brunell won the final MVP award in 1993.

The 1977 game featured California quarterback Joe Roth, who was fighting a battle with melanoma. The Japan Bowl ended up being the final football game of Roth's career; he died just a month after the game in February at the age of 21.

Several unrelated football games have been informally referred to as the "Japan Bowl", such as the 1993 Coca-Cola Classic, the 1994 Ivy Bowl, and some of the NFL's American Bowl games.

Game results

The West team won 11 games, while the East team won 7 games.
 NCAA records and contemporary news reports sometimes cite different game dates, likely due to differing time zones.
 NCAA records incorrectly list all games as having been played in Yokohama.

MVPs

Following the 1977 appearance of Joe Roth – an All-American quarterback from Cal who was suffering from melanoma, which would lead to his death weeks after playing in the game – the game's MVP recognition was given as the Joe Roth Memorial Award. The trophy is topped by Roth's helmet. The first recipient was Jimmy Cefalo of Penn State in 1978.

See also
 List of college bowl games

References

External links
 Joe Roth at the 1977 Japan Bowl

American football in Japan
College football all-star games
Annual sporting events in Japan
Defunct college football bowls
1976 establishments in Japan
1993 disestablishments in Japan
Recurring sporting events established in 1976
Recurring sporting events disestablished in 1993